Feelings Are Good and Other Lies is a solo album by the English musician John Taylor. It was released on the Internet in 1995; patrons had to email an AOL address to purchase it. A physical release followed in 1997. The record label, B5 Records, was co-founded by John Taylor and the producer, Hein Hoven.

Two songs on the album, the title track and "Always Wrong", also appeared on Neurotic Outsiders, but are presented as re-recorded versions with Taylor only. Steve Jones contributed guitar to the album.

Critical reception
Washington City Paper wrote that "although a proficient bass player, [Taylor]'s hardly a profound wordsmith."

Track listing
All tracks composed by John Taylor
 "Feelings R Good" – 3:03
 "Don't Talk Much" - 3:37
 "2:03" - 1:57
 "Everyone Is Getting It But Me" - 4:11
 "Always Wrong" - 3:07
 "Look Homeward Angel" - 4:10
 "Losing You" - 3:13
 "See You Again" - 2:55
 "Down Again" - 2:10
 "Girl Raw" - 4:02
 "Hole In The Mud" - 4:37
 "Trust The Process" (5:15 / includes hidden track "Encore for Bean" 3:13) - 8:28

Personnel
Steve Jones
David Palmer
John Shanks
Rick Boston
John Amato
Gerry Laffy
Roy Hay
Technical
Eric Ruffing - art direction, design
Nick Egan - art direction
Roger Mayne, Mario Sorrenti, Julie Verona - photography

References

1995 albums
John Taylor (bass guitarist) albums